The 1950 Oregon Webfoots football team represented the University of Oregon as a member of the Pacific Coast Conference (PCC) during the 1950 college football season. In their fourth and final season under head coach Jim Aiken, the Webfoots compiled a 1–9 record (0–7 against PCC opponents), finished in last place in the PCC, and were outscored by their opponents, 214 to 97. The team played its home games at Hayward Field in Eugene, Oregon.

Schedule

References

Oregon
Oregon Ducks football seasons
Oregon Webfoots football